Shen Junru (January 2, 1875 – June 11, 1963) was a Chinese lawyer and politician who was the president of the Supreme People's Court of the Central People's Government of the People's Republic of China. He was also the chairman of the China Democratic League.

Biography 
Shen was born in Suzhou, Jiangsu, with family ancestry in Jiaxing, Zhejiang during late Qing dynasty. He received the Jinshi or "presented scholar" degree, the highest under the imperial examination system. Shen completed a preparation course at Hosei University, in Tokyo, Japan in 1905.

Shen Junru and other six intellectuals in Shanghai were arrested in 1936 by Chiang Kai-shek's government, which is known as the Seven Gentlemen Incident. This incident caused a national crisis and the seven individuals were released only after Japan launched an invasion in the summer of 1937.

Shen attended the first Chinese People's Political Consultative Conference (CPPCC) in 1949 and was appointed to be the first President of the Supreme People's Court from 1949 to 1954. Shen had also served as a member of the committee of the Central People's Government, and was vice-chairman of the CPPCC National Committee from 1949 to 1963.

Additionally, Shen was vice-chairman of the Standing Committee of the National People's Congress from 1954 to 1963, and chairman of the China Democratic League from 1956 to 1963. He was also vice-chairman of the Chinese Political and Law Studies Association.

Notes

References 

1875 births
1963 deaths
19th-century Chinese lawyers
20th-century Chinese lawyers
19th-century Chinese judges
20th-century Chinese judges
Chairpersons of the China Democratic League
People's Republic of China politicians from Jiangsu
Politicians from Suzhou
Presidents of the Supreme People's Court
Vice Chairpersons of the National People's Congress
Vice Chairpersons of the National Committee of the Chinese People's Political Consultative Conference